Ivo Luis Aldazabal Diaz (born 10 May 1972 in Matanzas) is a retired Cuban-Hungarian handball player who most recently played for Tatabánya-Carbonex KC. Previously he played for Hungarian record champions KC Veszprém and Spanish clubs CB Ademar León and JD Arrate.

Diaz represented the Hungarian national team in three major tournaments. He first participated on the 2004 European Men's Handball Championship, where he achieved the ninth place. Few months later he was selected to the team that finished fourth at the 2004 Summer Olympics. His final appearance on an international event came in 2007, when he was part of the team that finished the World Championship in the ninth position.

References

1972 births
Living people
Sportspeople from Matanzas
Cuban emigrants to Hungary
Hungarian male handball players
Olympic handball players of Hungary
Handball players at the 2004 Summer Olympics
Expatriate handball players
Hungarian expatriate sportspeople in Spain